Dlouhomilov is a municipality and village in Šumperk District in the Olomouc Region of the Czech Republic. It has about 500 inhabitants. The historic centre is well preserved and is protected by law as a village monument zone.

Administrative parts
The village of Benkov is an administrative part of Dlouhomilov.

References

Villages in Šumperk District